= Women's Open =

Women's Open may refer to:

- U.S. Women's Open, an LPGA major championship
- Women's British Open, an LPGA and Ladies European Tour major championship
